The women's javelin throw event at the 1998 Commonwealth Games was held on 19 September in Kuala Lumpur.

This was the last time that the old model of javelin was used in the women's competition at the Commonwealth Games.

Results

References

Javelin
1998
1998 in women's athletics